Aiglon College is a private co-educational boarding school in the canton of Vaud, Switzerland. Founded in 1949 by former Gordonstoun teacher John C. Corlette, it occupies a scenic location in the alpine village of Chesieres, close to the ski resort of Villars.

The school prepares its students for IGCSE exams and the IB Diploma, and is also known for its extensive programme of outdoor education and prowess in winter sports.

History
Aiglon College was founded by John C. Corlette in 1949 and opened with just six pupils. A former teacher at Gordonstoun, Corlette had sympathised with the theories of its founder, Kurt Hahn, and began to think about opening a school of his own.

Corlette suffered from ill-health as a child and was never physically robust. This spurred a personal philosophy emphasising stamina and toughness, and upon which the principles of Aiglon would be founded. Corlette's decision to open a school in Switzerland was likely inspired by his own experience: he left Stowe at 16 to finish his education at Alpine College, having been sent there for the benefit of his health.

Following a financially precarious beginning, during which it rented various chalets, the school acquired its first permanent building with the purchase of the Hotel Beau-Site in 1955, now known as Clairmont. Though founded as a school on the British model, by 1957 half the student body were American nationals. British parents at this time were put off by a combination of high fees and a weak pound. 

That decade, another idea borrowed from Gordonstoun, the 'rank system', was implemented. This ranked boys according to merit, academic or otherwise, with extra privileges awarded to the higher ranked. In 1968 the school became co-educational and 22 girls arrived that September.

By the 1970s Aiglon had drawn some criticism due to the fullness of its programme, with the working day running from 7am to 8:45pm for the youngest children, and up to 11pm for the oldest; though the school maintained this was necessary to "develop the whole child" and set this against long vacation times, which lasted up to 11 weeks in the summer. American author Allen Kurzweil recalled the eccentricities he encountered when he was sent to Aiglon in 1971.

In line with the aims of its founder, school culture "placed a premium on stoic self-reliance" and injuries were a fact of life. During the academic year Kurzweil attended, one student lost the tips of two toes to frostbite, another almost died after falling into a crevasse, and a girl was permanently disfigured on the local slalom course after taking a bamboo gate too closely.

In 1972 the Indian spiritual leader Chinmayananda Saraswati visited the school and gave talks on the Hindu faith. That year, Corlette stepped down as Executive Headmaster and took on the new title of Director and Founder.

Student numbers continued to grow in the coming years and by 1983 there were approximately 250 pupils from 142 nationalities. Aiglon had also cemented itself as a popular choice for celebrities and the international jet set, with Gregory Peck, Sophia Loren, Roger Moore and Dame Joan Sutherland having already enrolled their children.

A 1995 Newsweek profile noted that high fees did not "buy luxury" at Aiglon, and student dormitories were surprisingly modest. Such "unpretentious surroundings" were said to be popular with wealthy parents who did not want their children to be living in too much comfort.

In 2019 Nicola Sparrow became the first woman to lead the school.

Administration and organization
Aiglon College Junior School caters for boys and girls in years 5 to 8 (US grades 4–7). The Senior School caters for students in years 9 to 13 (US Grades 8–12). Students are prepared for GCSE and IGCSE examinations at the end of year 11 (Grade 10) and for the International Baccalaureate in the final two years. Throughout the school, the curriculum is taught in English, with the exception of languages and literature.

All students are required to take part in expeditions every term. These include hiking, camping, mountain biking, kayaking, rock climbing, ski mountaineering, and other outdoor challenges.

The school is run by a volunteer Board of Directors who oversee the school’s strategic direction and continued alignment with its founding principles. The school’s senior management team responsible for its day-to-day management is called the School Council and is led by the Head of School.

Campus
Aiglon’s campus consists of approximately 40 different buildings and chalets spread across approximately 60,000 m2. The school has eight senior boarding houses and two junior houses. The village campus is a combination of existing chalets and renovated hotels joined with purpose-built buildings.

Notable alumni
 Shaun Ellis Agar, 6th Earl of Normanton (1946–2019), British cavalry officer, professional powerboat racer, impresario and entrepreneur
 David A. Anderson OC (Hon.), Canadian Member of Parliament, Queen's Privy Council (Ret), Olympian (silver medal, rowing, 1960)
 Abhishek Bachchan, Indian actor, co-owner Chennaiyin F.C., member of the Bachchan family
 Shashi Batra (1966–2017), American cosmetics industry executive, Co-Founder Sephora North America, Founder Credo Beauty
 Marcus de la Poer Beresford, 7th Baron Decies, Irish solicitor, Chairman A&L Goodbody.
 Martha "Sissy" Biggers, American television personality.
 Felix Bonnier, Swedish businessman, H&M, Bonnier Group, of the Bonnier family
 Alfonso de Orléans-Borbón, Duke of Galliera, Spanish racing driver, founder of Racing Engineering
 Eric J. Boswell, United States Assistant Secretary of State for Diplomatic Security and Director of the Office of Foreign Missions
 Struan Campbell-Smith, Canadian photographer
 Count Enrico Marone Cinzano, Italian artist and furniture designer
 Sir Coles Jeremy Child (1944-2022), British actor
 Alastair Crooke CMG, British diplomat, founder and director of the Conflicts Forum
 Ali Daud, Omani businessman, CEO of the Daud Group of Companies
 John Doggart OBE, British architect, pioneer of solar housing and sustainable construction, Chairman Sustainable Energy Academy, Trustee National Energy Foundation
 Andrés Duany, American architect and author
 Annabel Fay, New Zealand pop singer, daughter of Sir Michael Fay
 Gerald Feffer (1943–2013), American lawyer, former US Deputy Assistant Attorney General
 Roger C. Field, British inventor; inventor of the Foldaxe folding electric guitar.
 Marion Fischel, Israeli journalist (Jerusalem Post)
 Ben Freeth, MBE, Zimbabwean farmer and human rights activist.
 Jack Gerber, South African Formula One driver, Chairman Macsteel Group
 Eric Gibson, American journalist, Wall Street Journal editor
 Michel Gill, American actor
 Faris Glubb (1939–2004), British-Jordanian journalist and political activist, son of John Bagot Glubb
 Sheherazade Goldsmith, British journalist, environmentalist and jeweller
 Barry Golson, American author, former editor TV Guide and Playboy magazine
 François Grosjean, French psycho-linguist, academic and author
 Patricia Gucci, British businesswoman and author, daughter of Aldo Gucci
 Gordon Guillaumier, Italian designer
 Michael Haggiag, American producer
 Laura Harring, Countess von Bismarck-Schönhausen, Mexican-American actress, first Hispanic woman to be crowned Miss USA
 Nigel Harris, British aviator, founder of London Flight Centre Group and Montserrat Airways
 Hans Hickler, American businessman and author, former CEO DHL Express
 Anthony Hickox, British film director, producer and screenwriter
 Michael Hippisley MBE, established the Samaritans in the Scottish prison system
 Sir David Hoare, 9th Baronet, British banker (Hoares)
 Howard Hodgson, British funeral industry executive, former CEO Ronson Products and Colibri International
 Ken Howard (composer), English songwriter, lyricist, director and philanthropist. Co-Founder Sophisticated Games.
 Pamela Huizenga, American jewellery designer, daughter of Wayne Huizenga
 Bruce P. Jackson, American political strategist, founder and president of the Project on Transitional Democracies.
 Geoffrey James, Canadian photographer and journalist
 Tony Jashanmal, Kuwaiti-Indian businessman, Jashanmal Group
 Elisabeth Jensen, American education advocate and politician
 Michael Jewison, American producer, son of Norman Jewison
 Terence Kearley, 3rd Viscount Devonport, British architect
 Shaygan Kheradpir, American technology executive, former CTO of Verizon, former CEO of Juniper Networks
 Simon Kidston, British classic car dealer, commentator and car collector
 Karl Kirchwey, American poet
 Bill Koch, American Olympian (silver medal, cross-country skiing, 1976)
 Dion Kremer, British racing driver
 Allen Kurzweil, American novelist, journalist and editor
 Leka, Crown Prince of Albania (1939–2011)
 Andrew Leslie, CMM MSC MSM CD, Canadian Member of Parliament, Canadian Forces Lieutenant-General, Chief of the Land Staff (Ret)
 Lukas Lundin, Canadian businessman, Chairman Lundin Mining, Denison Mines, Lucara Diamond, NGEx Resources, Lundin Gold etc.
 Richard Marcus, American actor
 Alan Merrill (1951–2020), American composer and recording artist
 Henry Milles-Lade, 5th Earl Sondes (1940–1996), British businessman (agriculture), Chairman Gillingham FC
 Hamid Moghadam, American philanthropist and businessman, Chairman and CEO Prologis
 Megan Moulton-Levy, Jamaican-American professional tennis player
 Casey Murrow, American educator and philanthropist, son of Edward R. Murrow
 Jeffrey Nelson (1949–2015), American producer and director
 Don Nunes, American journalist, Washington Post editor
 Hank Palmieri (1954–1999), American filmmaker, founder and head of National Geographic's feature film division
 Princess Marsi Paribatra of Thailand (1931–2013), artist, art historian and author
 Brendan Parsons, 7th Earl of Rosse, Irish diplomat (United Nations), owner Birr Castle, sponsor of the Irish Manuscripts Commission
 Cecilia Peck, American film producer, director, actress
 Edoardo Ponti, Italian director/writer
 Don Alessandro Pucci, Marchese di Barsento (1959–1998), Italian businessman, member of the Pucci family.
 Hilary Saltzman (1961–2019), Canadian film producer, daughter of James Bond producer Harry Saltzman
 Roger Sanders, British-American radiologist and author, pioneer of ultrasound technology
 Fenton Sands, American international development expert, US Agency for International Development
 Julio Mario Santo Domingo III, Colombian-American impresario and businessman, of the Santo Domingo family
 Susan Schwab, American politician
 Princess Alia Al-Senussi, Libyan-American academic and arts patron, daughter of Prince Idris bin Abdullah al-Senussi
 Cora Sheibani, Swiss jewellery designer based in London
 Rohan Sippy, Indian film producer and director
 Paul Stewart, Scottish racing driver, son of Formula 1 driver Sir Jackie Stewart, co-founder Stewart Grand Prix (now Red Bull Racing)
 Masaru Tamamoto, Japanese scholar, World Policy Institute senior fellow
 Princess Tatiana of Greece and Denmark
 Sebastiano Tecchio, Italian filmmaker and fine art photographer
 James Thackara, British-American novelist
 Michael Todman, American businessman, former Vice-Chairman Whirlpool Corp (Ret)
 Alessandro Twombly, Italian artist, son of Cy Twombly.
 Heidi Ueberroth, American businesswoman, former president of National Basketball Association International, daughter of Peter Ueberroth
 Pieter van Doorne, Dutch businessman, co-founder of Booking.com, co-founder of Green Safaris
 Gary Vidor, Australian businessman and hotelier, TOGA Group of Companies
 Rod de Vletter, Swaziland environmental, conservation and eco-tourism specialist
 Caroline Wallenberg, Swedish businesswoman and philanthropist, member of the Wallenberg family
 Vivian White, British journalist and broadcaster
 Dean Young, American cartoonist (Blondie)

Notes

References

External links
Aiglon College
Good Schools Guide International

International schools in Switzerland
Private schools in Switzerland
Boarding schools in Switzerland
Round Square schools
British international schools in Switzerland
International Baccalaureate schools in Switzerland
 
Education in Villars-sur-Ollon